Appeal to ridicule (also called appeal to mockery, ad absurdo, or the horse laugh) is an informal fallacy which presents an opponent's argument as absurd, ridiculous, or humorous, and therefore not worthy of serious consideration.

Appeal to ridicule is often found in the form of comparing a nuanced circumstance or argument to a laughably commonplace occurrence or to some other irrelevancy on the basis of comedic timing, wordplay, or making an opponent and their argument the object of a joke. This is a rhetorical tactic that mocks an opponent's argument or standpoint, attempting to inspire an emotional reaction (making it a type of appeal to emotion) in the audience and to highlight any counter-intuitive aspects of that argument, making it appear foolish and contrary to common sense. This is typically done by making a mockery of the argument's foundation that represents it in an uncharitable and oversimplified way. The person using the tactic often utilizes sarcasm in their argument.

An example of an appeal to ridicule:

See also
 Reductio ad absurdum
 Straw man (a similar fallacy)

References

Ridicule